Robert Henry Murdoch (17 June 1909 – 30 April 1965) was an Australian rules footballer who played with Hawthorn in the Victorian Football League (VFL).

Notes

External links 

1909 births
1965 deaths
Australian rules footballers from Victoria (Australia)
Hawthorn Football Club players